The 2010–11 season was Peterhead's sixth consecutive season in the Scottish Second Division, having been promoted from the Scottish Third Division at the end of the 2004–05 season. Peterhead also competed in the Challenge Cup, League Cup and the Scottish Cup.

Summary
Peterhead finished Tenth in the Second Division and were relegated to the Scottish Third Division. They reached the Semi-final of the Scottish Challenge Cup, the second round of the League Cup and the fourth round of the Scottish Cup.

Management
Peterhead began the 2010–11 season under the management of Neale Cooper. On 22 March 2011, Cooper was sacked as manager, with Defender Bobby Mann being appointed as caretaker manager for their match that night against Stenhousemuir. John Sheran was then appointed as manager on a permanent basis.

Results and fixtures

Scottish Second Division

Scottish Challenge Cup

Scottish League Cup

Scottish Cup

Player statistics

Squad 

|}

League table

See also
List of Peterhead F.C. seasons

References

Peterhead F.C. seasons
Peterhead